The Unquestionable Truth (Part 1) is an EP by the American band Limp Bizkit, and their fifth major release overall. Released in 2005, it is the first release by the band to feature guitarist Wes Borland since he rejoined the group. He had left the band in 2001, and their previous album Results May Vary, was recorded without him. Drummer John Otto was absent for much of the album, and Sammy Siegler took over drumming duties for the band.

The EP differs from the band's established sound and lyrical subject matter by focusing on darker subjects and featuring a heavier, more experimental sound. The album's lyrics focus on subjects such as propaganda, Catholic sex abuse cases, terrorism and fame. Released without advertising and promotion, The Unquestionable Truth (Part 1) sold 37,000 copies during its first week in the United States, peaking at No. 24 on the Billboard 200. Reviews were mixed, but Borland's return to the band was praised, as was the new musical direction, which was considered to be ambitious.

After the release of the full-length album Gold Cobra in 2011, Limp Bizkit signed with Cash Money Records in early 2012. They had planned to release a sequel, titled The Unquestionable Truth (Part 2). However, the band left Cash Money Records in 2014, and never finished the sequel. The band eventually released the full-length album Still Sucks in 2021 instead.

Background 
In October 2001, Durst released a statement on their website stating that "Limp Bizkit and Wes Borland have amicably decided to part ways. Both Limp Bizkit and Borland will continue to pursue their respective musical careers. Both wish each other the best of luck in all future endeavors." The band recorded their next album Results May Vary with Snot guitarist Mike Smith. In 2004, Borland rejoined Limp Bizkit, and the band announced that they would begin recording a new album, The Unquestionable Truth (Part 1). Sammy Siegler took over drumming duties for the band for much of the album. Every song on the EP has their titles beginning with the definite article word "the".

Music and lyrics 

The Unquestionable Truth (Part 1) focuses on much more serious and ominous lyrical subject matter than the band is generally known for, including propaganda, Catholic sex abuse cases, terrorism and fame. IGN reviewer Spence D. described the album's sound as being "sinister", calling Wes Borland's guitar playing on "The Propaganda" a "skirling swirl of darkness". Allmusic reviewer Stephen Thomas Erlewine described the album's music as "neo-prog alt-metal". "The Truth" was strongly influenced from industrial music, while "The Key" features a funk-based sound. "The Surrender" features Fred Durst singing against Sam Rivers' minimalist bass lines and ambiance provided by DJ Lethal.

Release and reception 

The Unquestionable Truth (Part 1) was released as an underground album, without any advertising or promotion. Borland disagreed with the decision, suggesting that it was "self-sabotage": "Maybe he was already unhappy with the music, and he didn't really want to put it out there." The album sold 37,000 copies during its first week in the United States, peaking at number 24 on the Billboard 200. In its second week, sales reportedly fell by 67%, with only 12,000 copies sold. By March 2006, The Unquestionable Truth (Part 1) had sold 88,000 copies in the United States, numbers which were well below those of Limp Bizkit's past releases.

The album received mixed reviews. Allmusic's Stephen Thomas Erlewine said that the music is "a step in the right direction – it's more ambitious, dramatic, and aggressive, built on pummeling verses and stop-start choruses." However, he felt that the band was being "held back" by Durst, who he called "the most singularly unpleasant, absurd frontman in rock." In his book The Essential Rock Discography, Martin Charles Strong gave the album 5 out of 10 stars.

IGN writer Spence D. wrote, "Given the components of the band—live Limp Bizkit is one tight, intense sonic unit that delivers bristling renditions of their catalog—one would hope that they had chosen to go off the musical deep end and deliver an album that dares to explore rather than rehash. Sadly, only a few brief moments of The Unquestionable Truth (Part 1) exhibit this kind of much needed direction. Here's to hoping that Part 2 expands on the potential hinted at here."

Track listing

Personnel 
Musicians
 Fred Durst – vocals, rhythm guitar on "The Surrender"
 Wes Borland – guitars, harmonica on “The Surrender”
 DJ Lethal – keyboards, samples, programming, sound development
 Sammy Siegler – drums, percussion
 John Otto – drums, percussion on "The Channel"
 Sam Rivers – bass

Other personnel
 Wes Borland – cover art
 Fred Durst – executive producer
 Jordan Schur – executive producer

References 

2005 debut EPs
Limp Bizkit albums
Albums produced by Ross Robinson
Flip Records (1994) albums
Geffen Records albums